Worse may refer to:

 Worse Creek, Chattooga River, Georgia, USA; a creek
 worse set, in mathematics

See also

 
 The Worst (disambiguation)
 Worser (disambiguation)